Myles Patrick Dillon (11 April 1900 – 18 June 1972) was an Irish scholar whose primary interests were comparative philology, Celtic studies, and Sanskrit.

Life
Myles Dillon was born in Dublin; he was one of six children of John Dillon and his wife Elizabeth Mathew; James Dillon, the leader of Fine Gael, was his younger brother.

Myles Dillon graduated from University College Dublin, than travelled to Germany and France, where he studied in deep Old Irish and Celtic philology under Joseph Vendryes and Rudolf Thurneysen. Dillon taught Sanskrit and comparative philology in Trinity College, Dublin (1928–1930) and University College, Dublin (1930–1937). In 1937 moved to USA, where he taught Irish in the University of Madison (his son John M. Dillon was born in Madison), in 1946–1947 taught in Chicago. On his return to Ireland worked in the School of Celtic Studies in Dublin Institute for Advanced Studies; was the director of the School from 1960 till 1968, edited Celtica. Volume 11 of Celtica is dedicated to his memory. From 1966 to 1967 he was President of the Royal Irish Academy.

Myles Dillon is the author of a number of important scholarly books, handbooks and translations from Old Irish. Among his most notable works are The Cycles of the Kings (1946), Early Irish literature (1948), The Celtic realms (1967, with Nora Kershaw Chadwick). M. Dillon published a modern translation and commentary of The Book of Rights (1962). He also translated Dieux et héros des Celtes by Marie-Louise Sjoestedt into English, thus making the book available for a wider scholarly audience. The monograph Celts and Aryans, published posthumously by the Indian Institute of Advanced Study reflects Dillon's interest in the traces of the shared heritage in the Indian and Irish cultures deriving from Proto-Indo-European society based on a period of research Dillon spent in Simla, India.

Publications

References

External links
Recording of Dillon reading eleven early Irish lyrics, 

1900 births
1972 deaths
20th-century linguists
Academics of the Dublin Institute for Advanced Studies
Academics of the University of Edinburgh
Academics of Trinity College Dublin
Academics of University College Dublin
Alumni of University College Dublin
Celtic studies scholars
Irish philologists
Linguists from Ireland
Linguists of Indo-European languages
Linguists of Irish
Presidents of the Royal Irish Academy
People educated at Belvedere College
People from Dublin (city)
Sanskrit scholars
University of Bonn alumni
University of Chicago faculty
University of Wisconsin–Madison faculty